The Palazzo Roverella is a Renaissance-style palace located in via Laurenti 8/10, Rovigo, region of Veneto, Italy.

History and Description
The palace now serves as the town art and archeology gallery and host for exhibitions. The archeology collection includes artifacts and items from Egypt, Greece, Etruria, and Rome. The collection includes:
St Lucy and Scenes from her life by Quirizio da Murano
Christ carrying Cross by Giovanni Bellini
Madonna and Child by Pasqualino Veneto
Madonna and Child between St Jerome and St Helena (1520s) by Palma Vecchio
St Cajetan of Thiene by Giovanni Battista Piazzetta
Portrait of a young man by Andrea Previtali
Portrait of Antonio Riccobono by Giovanni Battista Tiepolo
Portrait of Cardinal Bartolomeo Roverella by Giovanni Battista Pittoni
Portrait of Giulio Contarini da Mula (1759) by Alessandro Longhi
Portrait of Giovanni Tommaso Minadois by Giuseppe Nogari
Portrait of Doge Alvise Pisani by Bartolomeo Nazzari
Portrait of Conte Gasparo Campo by Giovanni Battista Piazzetta
Sacred Conversation by Girolamo da Santacroce
Madonna and Child by Nicolo Rondinelli
The circumcision by Marco Bello

References

Palaces in Veneto
Renaissance architecture in Veneto
Museums in Veneto
Art museums and galleries in Veneto